In Nazi Germany, Sonder- und Ehrenhaft ("special or honorable detention") was an administrative status assigned to certain particularly prominent political prisoners, notably political leaders of Nazi-occupied countries and disgraced members of the German elite. Because of their political value or former status, they were treated uncommonly well, and all but a few of them survived the war.

Classification
The Nazi regime classified its political prisoners into numerous categories, including
Erziehungshäftlinge, "educational detainees";
Vorbeugehäftlinge, "preventative detainees";
Protektoratshäftlinge, "protectorate detainees"; as well as
Sonderhäftlinge and Ehrenhäftlinge, "special detainees" and "detainees of honor".

The latter category also included the "personal prisoners of the Führer" – opponents of the regime too prominent to be killed outright, as well as people like Hitler's failed assassin Georg Elser, who was initially kept alive with the intention of putting him on a show trial after the war.

Prisons
The SS-Reichssicherheitshauptamt, led by Heinrich Himmler, was responsible for the detention of the Sonder- und Ehrenhäftlinge. It built special detention centers for these prisoners in or near several concentration camps. Most of these facilities were much more comfortable than the camps' normal prisoner barracks.

As the war wore on, the SS increasingly requisitioned a great number of hotels, castles, palaces and mansions and repurposed them as detention centers. These included:
Schloss Hirschberg near Weilheim, the guesthouse of the Auswärtiges Amt.
Rheinhotel Dreesen in Bonn-Bad Godesberg after April 1944.
Hotel Ifen, a mountain hotel in the Kleinwalsertal, Austria.
Hotel Forelle, a luxury hotel in Tyrol, Austria.
Schloss Itter, a palace in Tyrol.

Several other detention centers for high-level prisoners were planned. Albert Speer was charged to rebuild the  Schwarzburg castle in the Schwarzatal, Thuringia, for this purpose, but the project was eventually abandoned. Inspired by the American prison of Alcatraz, SS officers searched the Baltic Sea coast for a suitable location of an island prison. In 1942, the SS decided to use the Pakri Islands near Baltischport (now Paldiski in Estonia) for this purpose, but the German defeat at Stalingrad put this position at risk and the project was also abandoned.

Conditions
The conditions under which the Sonder- und Ehrenhäftlinge were detained ranged from comfortable to luxurious, depending on their status. The prisoners did not have to work, were allowed to wear civilian clothing and ate the same food as their guards. After the war, Ernst Kaltenbrunner testified at the Nuremberg Trials that the prominent prisoners at places like Hotel Ifen or Bad Godesberg received "a triple diplomat's ration, that is to say, nine times the ration of a normal German during the war, as well as a bottle of Sekt each day."

Many detainees were allowed to receive visits by their family or to have their spouses live with them, and some of the highest-ranking prisoners, such as King Leopold III of Belgium, were allowed a small retinue of servants and followers. However, the prisoners normally had to pay for the cost of their detention. Kurt Schuschnigg, for instance, whose assets the Nazis had confiscated, was billed even for the cost of his relocation to Sachsenhausen.

List of Sonder- und Ehrenhäftlinge
The following is an incomplete list of notable Sonder- und Ehrenhäftlinge. Unless noted, the people listed here survived their detention.
Léon Blum, the former French Prime Minister, held with his wife at Buchenwald concentration camp.
Yakov Dzhugashvili, the son of Soviet leader Joseph Stalin, died at Sachsenhausen  in 1943.
Georg Elser, a German man who had tried to assassinate Hitler. Detained at Sachsenhausen, he was shot on 9 April 1945.
Philippe Pétain, the leader of Vichy France, was detained at Schloss Sigmaringen after September 1944, nominally as head of the French government-in-exile.
André François-Poncet, a French diplomat, detained at Hotel Ifen.
Geneviève de Gaulle-Anthonioz, the niece of Charles de Gaulle, detained at Ravensbrück.
Princess Mafalda of Savoy, the daughter of King Victor Emmanuel III of Italy, held at Buchenwald and killed in 1944 in an Allied air raid.
Miklós Horthy, Regent of the Kingdom of Hungary, arrested in 1944 for lack of cooperation with Nazi Germany and held at Schloss Hirschberg.
Leopold III, King of Belgium, detained first at the Royal Castle of Laeken, then at Hirschstein in Saxony from June 1944 to March 1945, and then at Strobl, Austria.
Benito Mussolini, the former Fascist leader of Italy, was briefly detained at Schloss Hirschberg after his rescue in the Gran Sasso raid, before being sent back to Italy to lead a German puppet state.
Martin Niemöller, a noted German anti-Nazi theologian and Lutheran pastor, detained at Sachsenhausen and Dachau.
Francesco Saverio Nitti,  the former Italian Prime Minister, detained at Hotel Ifen.
The family of Rupprecht von Bayern, Crown Prince of Bavaria.
Albert Sarraut, the former French Prime Minister, detained at Hotel Ifen.
Kurt Schuschnigg, the former Austrian chancellor, detained at Sachsenhausen with his wife and children, who joined him voluntarily.
Yaroslav Stetsko, member of the Organization of Ukrainian Nationalists. Refused the German request to retract the proclamation of Ukrainian statehood of 30 June 1941 in Lviv, in which he had stated that the new Ukrainian state would "cooperate closely with Germany". But so as not to harm German-Ukrainian relations, agreed to be taken into custody. On 9 July he was taken to Berlin and released on 12 July, but was ordered to stay in Lviv.

Bibliography
The detention of the Sonder- und Ehrenhäftlinge is covered in a 2010 monograph by German historian Volker Koop:

References

Terminology of Nazi concentration camps
Nazi SS
Prisoners and detainees of Germany

See also